Shulamit Shalit, also known as Shulamit Shalit-Rudnik (born in 1939) is an Israeli writer, journalist and essayist. Her writings are mostly in Russian.

Biography and work
She was born in Lithuania and  moved to Israel in 1980.

Since 1991 she was the host and an author of the radio program Literary Pages of Israel Radio International, where she released over 200 radio-essays in literature and music. She published many essays in literary science in Russophone publications in Israel, Russia, and United States. She is an author and editor of the series of collections "Jews in the Culture of the Russian Diaspora" (Евреи в культуре русского Зарубежья).

In 2015 she was awarded Prize of the Union of Russian-Speaking Writers of Israel in prose category.

Books
2012 Печать любви [Pechat Lyubvi, A Seal of Love]
2015: חותם של אהבה [Hotam shel ahavah], 
 2003: (with Elena Zhukova) The Maria and Mikhail Zetlin Art Collection, Department of Museums, Ramat Gan  
2005: На круги свои (a phrase from Ecclesiastes 1: :ru:На круги своя,  In circulos suos regreditur) Jerusalem, Philobiblon
1996: "С одним народом я скорблю" : к открытию Музея русского искусства им. Mарии и Михаила Цетлиных в Рамат-Гане, Израиль,   "Skopus", Israel

Essays about notable persons
About Alter Druyanov: "Король еврейской шутки" 
About Vladimir Admoni:
About Leah Goldberg: "Раз позволено жить — нужно любить" 
About Maria Petrovykh: ""Я домолчалась до стихов..." О Марии Петровых, поэте и переводчике" 
About Dave Tarras: "Король клейзмеров Дэйв Таррас (1897-1989)"

References

1939 births
Living people
Israeli writers
Israeli journalists
Israeli essayists